Róbert Liščák (born 4 April 1978) is a Slovak professional ice hockey player who played with HC Slovan Bratislava in the Slovak Extraliga.

Career statistics

Awards and honors

References

External links

Living people
Slovak ice hockey centres
1978 births
Augusta Lynx players
HC '05 Banská Bystrica players
HC Kometa Brno players
HC Slovan Bratislava players
HC Slovan Ústečtí Lvi players
HK 36 Skalica players
HK 91 Senica players
HKM Zvolen players
Maine Black Bears men's ice hockey players
MsHK Žilina players
Nottingham Panthers players
Providence Bruins players
Trenton Titans players
Sportspeople from Skalica
Slovak expatriate ice hockey players in Canada
Slovak expatriate ice hockey players in the Czech Republic
Slovak expatriate ice hockey players in the United States
Slovak expatriate sportspeople in England
Expatriate ice hockey players in England